La Guinea is a corregimiento in Balboa District, Panamá Province, Panama with a population of 83 as of 2010. Its population as of 1990 was 245; its population as of 2000 was 90.

References

Corregimientos of Panamá Province